Fatemiyeh may refer to:
 Fatemiyeh, Ilam
 Fatemiyeh, Shirvan and Chardaval, Ilam Province
 Fatemiyeh, Shirvan, Ilam Province
 Fatemiyeh, Razavi Khorasan